Sema Meray (born 26 February 1968) is a Turkish actress and author.

Born in Mersin, Turkey, Meray grew up in Germany. She became known to a wider audience when she took over the role of Helga Schrader in the WDR TV series Die Anrheiner in 1998. She retained this role until 2003. She is occasionally seen in Lindenstraße as Aunt Hatice. Meray also works as a theatre actress, as an author and in lipsyncing.

In February 2008, her theatre performed Wegen der Ehre, along with Vedat Erincin, directed by Till Rickelt in an outdoor workshop at the Free Workshop of the Cologne Theatre. In this piece, the actress who plays her is her daughter Lilli Hollunder.

Meray is also committed to the preservation of the Mor Gabriel Monastery in Turkey.

In early 2014, Meray married her partner, Hubertus, Prinz von Sayn-Wittgenstein-Berleburg, and currently lives with him at Strauweiler Castle in Odenthal in the Bergisches Land.

Filmography (selection) 
 1997: Unter uns
 1999–2003: Die Anrheiner (recurring)
 2002: Tatort – Schützlinge (TV series)
 2003: Die Sitte – Flüstertöne
 2004: Cologne P.D. – Tod am Bau
 2005–2011: In aller Freundschaft (recurring)
 2006–2011: Lindenstraße (recurring)
 2008: 
 2010: Stolberg – Bei Anruf Mord
 2010: Tatort – Schmale Schultern
 2012: Storm of Love
 2014–2015: Rote Rosen

References

External links 
 

1968 births
Living people
People from Mersin
German film actresses
German television actresses
German stage actresses
German people of Turkish descent
Turkish emigrants to West Germany
People from North Rhine-Westphalia